The siege of Ath (15 May 1697 – 5 June 1697) was a siege of the Nine Years' War. The French stockpiled 266,000 French pounds of gunpowder for the siege and used less than half of it. Consumption of other material amounted to 34,000 pounds of lead, 27,050 cannonballs, 3,400 mortar bombs, 950 grenades and 12,000 sandbags. The financial costs were 89,250 French livres. After the garrison's capitulation, 6,000 peasant workers filled up the trenches. Under the terms of surrender, the  Allied garrison marched off to freedom and was not taken prisoner. Of the 62 French engineers present, two were killed and seven seriously wounded. This demonstration of French military potency, combined with the successful storming of Barcelona the same year, convinced the Allies to come to terms with France in the treaty of Ryswick, thus ending the war.

The siege was hailed by contemporaries as Vauban's masterpiece and the most efficient siege ever conducted, owing to its speed, low costs and the modernity of the eight-bastion fortress, which had been designed by Vauban himself 25 years earlier.

Background
When the War of the Grand Alliance broke out in 1688 the modern Spanish fortress of Ath stood on the sidelines of the fighting.
The French armies of Louis XIV menaced the more important fortified towns of Brussels and Oudenarde, while leaving untouched the medium-sized Ath with its 6,000 inhabitants.

Peace negotiations to end the war got underway in 1695 in Ryswick but the absence of a knockout blow on either side encouraged the participants to continue the struggle. When the Duchy of Savoy defected from the Grand Alliance in late 1696, Louis XIV saw that the time had come decide the issue on the Spanish Netherlands front. In mid-April 1697 French forces began the campaign and prepared to besiege the strong fortress of Ath to demonstrate France's military pre-eminence to the Allied negotiators.

Prelude
In 1540 Ath's medieval walls and château had been upgraded by the Spanish. Upon the French capture of the fort during the War of Devolution in June 1667 when the Spanish garrison fled the town without fighting, the walls were razed by Vauban in 1668. From 1668–1674 he replaced the ancient fortifications with eight new trace italienne angled bastions. In 1678 the modern fort was handed back to the Spanish as part of the Treaties of Nijmegen.

The fort's curtain wall was surrounded by a ditch that made the top of the wall 30-feet high to someone standing at the bottom. When opened, a sluice gate added eight feet to the water's height, which was normally only several feet high. The bastions were within effective musket range of each other or no more than 600 feet apart. The bastions were separated by chevron-shaped outworks called tenailles located above the ditch. In front of the outworks were huge, triangular ravelin islands with masonry fortifications that could house hundreds of soldiers and several small-caliber guns. The outer wall of the ditch was known as the counterscarp, which served as the covered way around the fort. At Ath it was located 120 feet beyond the ravelins. The angled salients of the open-air walkway were usually the first to be captured but smaller re-entry angles between and behind the salients could be packed with dozens of troops to prevent the besieger from exploiting the capture of one section of the counterscarp. Two of the Ath bastions also had reinforced bulwarks in front of them for additional protection. The sloped glacis was the final piece of the outer perimeter. It presented the besiegers with murderous interlocking fields of fire from the defenders, who also had a double line of palisades at the top of the slope. A contemporary journal called Vauban's creation a "perfect model of the Art". The French engineer himself had given some thought to the matter of besieging the fort ever since he had designed it.

The commander of the siege force, Marshal Nicolas Catinat and his chief engineer Marshal Vauban had a strong working relationship and would cooperate seamlessly during the siege. Catinat had 50 battalions and as many squadrons of cavalry, some 40,000 men in total. Vauban was assisted by Jean de Mesgrigny and 62 select engineers. Marshals Boufflers and Villeroi commanded the two covering forces, whose combined strength amounted to 140,000 men.

The under-strength Allied garrison of 3,850 men was commanded by the lethargic 65-year old Comte de Roeux. Due to Roeux's frequent inactivity, command devolved to Anthony Günther, Prince of Anhalt-Zerbst. The Marquis de Conflans had been ordered to take command of the fortress' regiments but was captured by the French on 16 May before he could make the journey. The Allies had prioritized the more important forts of Brussels and Oudenarde and would be caught by surprise when the siege of Ath began.

Investment
A 12,000-man French cavalry force arrived before Ath on the morning of 16 May, securing all roads, river crossings, abbeys and buildings within a several-kilometer radius. Catinat's main force left Helchin the same day, crossed the Scheldt river and established itself in three camps about 10 kilometers from the fortress. The camps were separated by the Western and Eastern branches of the River Dender, which meet at Ath, and the French got to work setting up siege lines and regimental quarters and building bridges to facilitate communications. Boufflers' and Villeroi's armies took up covering positions on Catinat's flanks.

Wealthy women inside the fort were let go by the French the same day. On 17 May, the Allied garrison indiscriminately burned down the buildings outside the fort to deny the French of cover and concealment, without giving any thought to the most likely French avenues of approach. They also failed to burn down the hedgerows and gardens, of which the French would make use. The Allies directed inaccurate cannon fire at the far too distant French camps. All of this was noted by Vauban, who concluded that governor Roeux was an incompetent.

Civilian surgeons from the surrounding cities such as Valenciennes and Cambrai were conscripted to assist the French military surgeons with the wounded. 4,000 wagons were required to transport supplies and armaments and their civilian driver teams had to recruited from the region as well. Some 20,000 peasants were ordered to help dig the lines of circumvallation to defend against attacks from the garrison or possible relief forces.

Siege
Catinat and Boufflers reviewed their forces on 22 May; at 7:00 PM the first parallel trench was opened against the eastern side of the town from a distance of 650 paces.

Aftermath

References

Citations

Bibliography
 
 
 

Siege of Ath
Sieges involving France
Sieges involving the Dutch Republic
Sieges involving the Holy Roman Empire
Sieges involving Spain
Battles of the Nine Years' War
Battles involving the Spanish Netherlands
Siege